Chandi or Chandika is a Hindu deity. Chandika is another form of Mahadevi, similar to Durga. Chandika is a powerful form of Mahadevi who manifested to destroy evil. She is also known as Kaushiki, Katyayani, Asthadasabuja Mahalakshmi and Mahishasuramardini.

History 
Chandi represents the killer of Chanda. Chanda and Munda were Ashur's strong army generals. The word Chandi also refers to the fiery power of anger of the Brahman. Bhaskararaya, a leading authority on matters concerning Devi worship, defines Chandi as 'the angry, terrible or passionate one'. While scholars debate whether an old Goddess was Sanskritized or a suppressed Goddess was reclaimed, the fact remains that since the very early days, the Devi was worshiped in the subcontinent regardless of whether she appears as a supreme deity in Sanātanī texts. Scholars who trace her tracks show that she was very much a part of an early theistic impulse as it was being crystallised in the Indic mind. C. Mackenzie Brown writes:

"Hymns to goddesses in the late portions of the great Mahabharata epic and in the Harivamsa (AD 100-300) reveal the increasing importance of female deities in Brahminical devotional life.… The re-emergence of the divine feminine in the Devi-Mahatmya was thus both the culmination of centuries-long trends and the inspirational starting point for new investigations into the nature of feminine transcendence."

When she does appear in Markandeya Purana, in the section known as Caṇḍī Pāṭha or Devī Māhātmya, she proclaims her preeminence:

This text recounts the tale of male demons and their destruction by the Great Goddess and traces its lineage through the Devīsūkta in the Rigveda and also connects with the Samkhya Prakriti to establish itself as a canonical text for the Shaktas.

Chandi, the fiercest form of the Goddess, is the main deity of the famous Devi Mahatmya, a great poem of seven hundred verses (also called Durga Saptashati or Chandi Patha) which celebrates how she fights and destroys the greatest demons.  As Chandi, the destroyer of opposition, she can be invoked for removing obstacles, to allow us to attain Puruṣārtha, the four goals of human life.

The designation of Chandi or Chandika is used twenty-nine times in the Devi Mahatmya, which is agreed by many scholars to have had originated in Bengal, the primary seat of the Shakta or Goddess tradition and tantric sadhana since ancient times. It is the most common epithet used for the Goddess. In Devi Mahatmya, Chandi, Chandika, Ambika and Durga have been used synonymously.

The basis for Chandi worship is found in the Devi Bhagavata as well as in the Markandeya Purana containing the well-known Saptashati. This narrates the three tales of Chandika fighting and destroying the evil forces in the forms of Madhu & Kaitabha, Dhumralochana, Chanda and Munda, Raktabeeja, Shumbha & Nishumbha, and Mahishasura. These stories are narrated in thirteen chapters in the form of seven hundred stanzas or half stanzas. Each of these is considered as an independent mantra, by repeating which one attains profound benefits.

Goddess Chandi is associated with the nine-lettered Navakshari mantra that has its basis in the Devi Upanishad, one of the five Atharva Shirsha Upanishads. It is also called Navarna Mantra or Navavarna Mantra. Besides the Sri Vidhya mantras, it is one of the principal mantras in Shakti worship. It is customary to chant this mantra when chanting the Devi Mahatmya. She is supposed to live in a place called Mahakal, which is close to Kailasa

Named after the goddess is the city of Chandigarh (literally: 'fort of Chandi'), the joint capital of the Indian states of Punjab and Haryana.

Legends
Chandika is an avatar of Durga. The three principal forms of Durga worshipped are Mahagauri, Chandika and Aparajita. Of these, Chandika has two forms called Chandi and Chamunda who is created by the goddess Kaushiki for killing demons Chanda and Munda.

She is known as the supreme goddess Mahishasuramardini or  Durga who slayed the demon Mahishasura. She has been affiliated with and also considered as Katyayini, Kaushiki or Ambika who killed Shumbha, Nishumbha and their fellow demons.  "The great Goddess was born from the energies of the male divinities when the devas became impotent in the long-drawn-out battle with the asuras. All the energies of the Gods became united and became supernova, throwing out flames in all directions. Then that unique light, pervading the Three Worlds with its lustre, combined into one, and became a female form."

"Devi projected overwhelming omnipotence. The three-eyed goddess was adorned with the crescent moon. Her multiple arms held auspicious weapons and emblems, jewels and ornaments, garments and utensils, garlands and rosaries of beads, all offered by the gods. With her golden body blazing with the splendour of a thousand suns, seated on her lion vehicle, Chandi is one of the most spectacular of all personifications of Cosmic energy."

In other scriptures, Chandi is portrayed as "assisting" Kali in her battle with the demon Raktabīja. Chandi wounded him, but a new demon sprang up from every drop of his blood that fell on the ground. By drinking Raktabīja's blood before it could reach the ground, Kali enabled Chandi to first destroy the armies of demons and finally kill Raktabīja himself. In Skanda Purana, this story is retold and another story of Mahakali killing demons Chanda and Munda is added. Authors Chitralekha Singh and Prem Nath says, "Narada Purana describes the powerful forms of Lakshmi as Durga, Kali, Bhadrakali, Chandi, Maheshwari, Lakshmi, Vaishnavi and Andreye".

Chandi Homa (Havan)

Chandi Homa is one of the most popular Homas in Hindu religion. It is performed across India during various festivals, especially during the Navaratri. Chandi Homa is performed by reciting verses from the Durga Sapthasathi and offering oblations into the sacrificial fire. It could also be accompanied by the Navakshari Mantra. Kumari Puja, Suvasini Puja also form a part of the ritual.

Iconography

The dhyana sloka preceding the Middle episode of Devi Mahatmya the iconographic details are given. The Goddess is described as having vermilion complexion, eighteen arms bearing string of beads, battle axe, mace, arrow, thunderbolt, lotus, bow, water-pot, cudgel, lance, sword, shield, conch, bell, wine-cup, trident, noose and the discus (sudarsana). She has a complexion of coral and is seated on a lotus. In some temples the images of Maha Kali, Maha Lakshmi, and Maha Saraswati are kept separately. The Goddess is also portrayed as four armed in many temples.

As Purnachandi, she is visualised as both the essence as well as transcendence i.e. the Brahman; who is beyond Laghu Chandika, who is of the combined form of Parvati, Lakshmi and Saraswati as represented in Durga Saptashati of Markandeya Purana. As Purnachandi, she sports with her sixteen hands, sword, arrow, spear, shakti, chakra, mace, rosary, khartal, phalaka, karmuka, nagapasha, axe, damaru, skull, boon gesture and protection gesture.

In folklore of Bengal
Chandi is one of the most popular folk deities in Bengal, and a number of poems and literary compositions in Bengali called Chandi Mangala Kavyas were written from 13th century to early 19th century. These had the effect of merging the local folk and tribal goddesses with mainstream
Hinduism. The Mangal kavyas often associate Chandi with goddess Kali or Kalika and recognise her as a consort of Shiva and mother of Ganesha and Kartikeya, which are characteristics of goddesses like Parvati and Durga. The concept of Chandi as the supreme Goddess also underwent a change. The worship of the goddess became heterogeneous in nature.

Chandi is associated with good fortune. Her auspicious forms like Mangal Chandi, Sankat Mangal Chandi, Rana Chandi bestow joy, riches, children, good hunting and victory in battles while other forms like Olai Chandi cure diseases like cholera, plague and cattle diseases.

These are almost all village and tribal Goddesses with the name of the village or tribe being added onto the name Chandi. The most important of these Goddesses is Mongol Chandi who is worshipped in the entire state and also in Assam. Here the word "Mongol" means auspicious or benign.

See also
 Chandi di Var (in Sikhism)
 Candi of Indonesia

Notes

References

 Coburn, Thomas B., "Devī Māhātmya, The Crystallization of the Goddess Tradition", South Asia Books, 2002.
 Manna, Sibendu, Mother Goddess, Punthi Pustak, Calcutta, India, 1993.
 Mookerjee, Ajit, Kali, The Feminine Force, Destiny Books, Rochester, Vermont, 1988,
 Sankaranarayanan, S., Glory of the Divine Mother (Devī Māhātmyam), Nesma Books, India, 2001.
 McDaniel, June, Offering Flowers, Feeding Skulls: Popular Goddess Worship in West , Published 2004, Oxford University Press - US, 368 pages, 
 McDaniel, June, Making Virtuous Daughters and Wives: An Introduction to Women's Brata Rituals in Benegal Folk Religion, Published 2002, SUNY Press, 144 pages, 
 Wilkins, William Joseph, Hindu Mythology, Vedic and Puranic, Published 2004, Kessinger Publishing, 428 pages,  (First edition: Published 1882; Thacker, Spink & co.)

 

Hindu goddesses
Mother goddesses
Shaktism
War goddesses
Forms of Parvati